PBS YOU (the latter word is an acronym for "Your Own University") was founded in the late 1990s as a 24/7 channel/network featuring formal and informal educational programs and college-related fare, largely to take advantage of available rights and satellite transponder space and eager customers for carriage among the satellite-dish and some cable television companies.

How-to programs and public affairs programs and news predominated. An American Public Television, WGBH and WNET partnership now offers two similar alternative national services, Create, which was introduced in January, 2006, and World, beginning national service August 2007.

PBS YOU formerly included PBS Adult Learning Service (ALS) telecourses for college credit and foreign language instruction. PBS ALS has been decommissioned as of September 2005; the Annenberg/CPB Channel remains in place as a source of networked feeds of credit courses.

Demise 
PBS YOU had long been vulnerable to budget concerns at PBS.

In late 2001, YOU was in danger of being shut down altogether. A deal with New River Media, producers of Think Tank and with the producers of the Standard Deviants educational series for teens helped to provide a reprieve for the channel, which largely reverted to its initial mix of programming in 2002 after having carried a preponderance of programming from those two sources.

In the wake of the closure of the original incarnation of the PBS Kids Channel on September 26, 2005 (in favor of the new commercial partnership service PBS Kids Sprout), YOU's future was once again in doubt and eventually followed suit on January 9, 2006. The Create network was created to partially fill the void left by the closure of YOU.

Prior to its cancellation, PBS YOU was carried by 67 PBS member stations (via ATSC subchannels), DirecTV, Dish Network and select digital cable providers.

See also 
 Create (television network)

External links
Archived official website at the Wayback Machine

Public Broadcasting Service
Defunct television networks in the United States
Television channels and stations established in 1998
Television channels and stations disestablished in 2006
Educational and instructional television channels
English-language television stations in the United States